Xylotrechus colonus is a species of beetle in the family Cerambycidae, subfamily Cerambycinae, and tribe Clytini. Its common name is the rustic borer. It was described by Johan Christian Fabricius in 1775. The larva of this beetle feed on the sapwood of oaks (Quercus), whereas adults feed on the nectar of flowers such as goldenrod (Solidago), and some composite flowers. The wing covers are grey, with bands of black and a yellow dash near the top of each. The underside of the beetle is black, with faint yellow banding.

References

Xylotrechus
Beetles described in 1775
Taxa named by Johan Christian Fabricius